Max Schmidheiny (1908–1991) was a Swiss industrialist.

In 1984, he divided the family construction materials empire between his sons,
Thomas Schmidheiny inheriting Holcim, the concrete and cement company, and Stephan Schmidheiny was given the construction company Eternit.

References

1908 births
1991 deaths
20th-century Swiss businesspeople
Max